Hérouard or Herouard is a surname, and refers to the following:

  (b.1956), French bishop
  (1833-1888), French politician
 Chéri Hérouard (1881–1961), French illustrator
  (1851-1927), French politician
 Edgard Hérouard (1858–1932), French marine biologist
 Jean Hérouard, French royal phyicisian and cocreator of the Ménagerie du Jardin des plantes
  (1921-2004), French association football player
 Thibouville-Herouard, former brand name of Cabart musical instruments
 Patrick Herouard, French grand prix racer

Hérouard